Mahmoud Gharbi (born 11 February 1982) is a Tunisian handball player. At the 2012 Summer Olympics he competed with the Tunisia men's national handball team in the men's tournament.

References

Living people
1982 births
Handball players at the 2012 Summer Olympics
Olympic handball players of Tunisia
Tunisian male handball players
Sportspeople from Tunis
Competitors at the 2009 Mediterranean Games
Mediterranean Games bronze medalists for Tunisia
Mediterranean Games medalists in handball
21st-century Tunisian people
20th-century Tunisian people